Hindustan Hamara is a 1950 Bollywood film directed by Paul Zils and starring Prithviraj Kapoor and Dev Anand.

Cast
Prithviraj Kapoor
Dev Anand
Durga Khote
Nalini Jaywant

References

External links

1950 films
1950s Hindi-language films
Indian documentary films
1950 documentary films
Indian black-and-white films